Xiomara Molero Jiménez (born April 23, 1971, in Río Piedras, Puerto Rico) is a retired Puerto Rican female volleyball player and coach that played with the Puerto Rican national team at the 2002 FIVB Volleyball Women's World Championship.

Career
She was part of the Puerto Rico women's national volleyball team at the 2002 FIVB Volleyball Women's World Championship in Germany, She played for Criollas de Caguas in 2002. In 2015, she coached the U20 Puerto Rican team.

Personal info
Molero's parents, Ramón Molero and Andrea Jiménez, are Dominicans who migrated to Puerto Rico.

Clubs
  Mets de Guaynabo (1987-2000)
  Criollas de Caguas (2001-2006)

References

External links 
 FIVB Profile
 
 

1971 births
Living people
Puerto Rican women's volleyball players
People from Río Piedras, Puerto Rico